Frecklington may refer to:

Deb Frecklington (born 1971), Australian politician, member of the Legislative Assembly of Queensland
Lee Frecklington (born 1985), former professional footballer
W. J. Frecklington (born 1949), Australian maker of carriages

See also
Eckington (disambiguation)